Mark Eugene Gray (October 24, 1952 – December 2, 2016) was an American singer-songwriter and country music artist. He recorded both as a solo artist for Columbia Records and as a member of the country pop band Exile, of which he was a member between 1979 and 1982.

Gray's solo career included three albums and nine singles, of which the highest-peaking is the No. 6 Tammy Wynette duet "Sometimes When We Touch", a cover of the Dan Hill song. Gray also co-wrote "Take Me Down" and "The Closer You Get", both of which were originally recorded by Exile in 1980 and later became Number One hits for Alabama. Other songs that Gray co-wrote include "It Ain't Easy Bein' Easy" for Janie Fricke and "Second Hand Heart" for Gary Morris. He died on December 2, 2016, at the age of 64.

Discography

Albums

Singles

References

Brennan, Sandra. [ Mark Gray] at Allmusic

1952 births
2016 deaths
American country singer-songwriters
American male singer-songwriters
Columbia Records artists
Singer-songwriters from Mississippi
Musicians from Vicksburg, Mississippi
Exile (American band) members
Country musicians from Mississippi
Country musicians from Tennessee
Singer-songwriters from Tennessee